The women's 3000 metres race of the 2012 World Single Distance Speed Skating Championships was held on March 22 at 16:30 local time.

Results

References

2012 World Single Distance Speed Skating Championships
World